Nye County School District provides public education for all grades in Nye County, Nevada, as well as 6th through 12th grade education for students living in Esmeralda County, due to its school district having no high school. The headquarters of the district are in Tonopah. The district serves 17 schools. The school district also serves 5,933 students with over 322 Administrators & Faculty Members. The N.C.S.D. Motto is Every Child A Success.

At , Nye County School District is the largest school district in the contiguous 48 states by area, and the 15th largest in the United States, preceded entirely by the school districts of Alaska.

History
In 1955 the Nye County district agreed to receive tuition from Esmeralda County district to pay for that district's high school students' tuition at Tonopah High.

NCSD schools
Amargosa Valley School
Beatty Elementary/Middle School
Duckwater School
 By 1975 Duckwater School, with one teacher, had an enrollment count of six as students had withdrawn with the opening of the reservation school. Prior to loss of Native American students, the school district provided heated lunches, and there were two teachers instead of one. By 1986 enrollment was up to 13 and the relationship between the Duckwater School and Duckwater Shoshone School community had mended. The teacher by then had an aide for assistance, and used the aide and older students to have all students of all ages be on task. Of the 13 students, nine had at least one sibling also in their classes. Students came from ranching and mining families. Duckwater area students for high school generally move on to non-Nye County high schools: White Pine County School District facilities in Ely and Lund and Eureka County School District's Eureka County High School.
Floyd Elementary
Gabbs School
Hafen Elementary
J.G. Johnson Elementary School
Manse Elementary
Round Mountain Elementary
Tonopah Elementary/Middle School
Rosemary Clarke Middle School
Round Mountain Junior/Senior High
Beatty High School
Pahrump Valley High School 
Tonopah High School
As of 2022 Esmeralda County residents attend Tonopah High.
Adult Education
Pathways Innovative Education

References

School districts in Nevada
Education in Nye County, Nevada